Khalid bin Abdullah Al Khalifa (born in 1944, Muharraq) is a Bahraini royal, engineer and deputy prime minister of Bahrain.

Family
His full name is Sheikh Khalid bin Abdullah bin Khalid bin Ali bin Khalifa bin Salman bin Ahmed bin Mohammed bin Khalifa Al Khalifa. Born in 1944 in the northern city of Muharraq, he was named after his grandfather, Sheikh Khalid bin Ali Al Khalifa (1853-1925). Khalid bin Abdullah is the second of four sons of Sheikh Abdullah bin Khalid Al Khalifa and his wife Sheikha Hessa bint Muhammad bin Abdullah Al Khalifa, both now deceased. Sheikh Abdullah bin Khalid chaired the Supreme Council for Islamic Affairs from its establishment in 2005 until his death in 2018. He also held ministerial positions such as Deputy Prime Minister and Minister of Islamic Affairs (2002-2006).

Sheikh Khalid bin Abdullah’s brothers include the following, ranked from eldest to youngest:
 Muhammad bin Abdullah bin Khalid, a physician and lieutenant general in the military, Ministry of Defense from 2006 to 2010 and current Chairman of the Supreme Council of Health
 Ali bin Abdullah bin Khalid (died August 2009), also a doctor, and his son is Sheikh Khalid bin Ali bin Abdullah bin Khalid Al Khalifa, current Minister of Justice, Islamic Affairs, and Endowments
 Ibrahim, a retired engineer who worked on King Fahd Causeway linking the island with Saudi Arabia, holds a Bachelor of Science degree in engineering from King Fahd University of Petroleum and Minerals

Personal life
Sheikh Khalid bin Abdullah has nine children, four sons and five daughters, all from his wife Maryam bint Salman Al Khalifa, sister of the late Emir of Bahrain Sheikh Isa bin Salman Al Khalifa, the late Prime Minister of Bahrain Khalifa bin Salman Al Khalifa, and the late Prince Mohammed ibn Salman Al Khalifa (who died on November 9, 2009). She is also the aunt of King of Bahrain Hamad bin Isa Al Khalifa.

Their children include the following:
 Sheikha Zain bint Khalid bin Abdullah, wife of Sheikh Ali bin Khalifa Al Khalifa, her cousin and the Deputy Prime Minister; she has headed the Al-Mabarrah Al-Khalifia Foundation since May 30, 2011
 Farah bint Khalid bin Abdullah
 Sheikha Hessa bint Khalid bin Abdullah, Chair of the Women’s Committees of the Bahrain Football Association and the Union of Arab Football Associations
 Dhuwa bint Khalid bin Abdullah
 Nouf bint Khalid bin Abdullah
 Salman bin Khalid bin Abdullah
 Abdullah bin Khalid bin Abdullah, Chairman of the Board of Riffa SC
 Isa bin Khalid bin Abdullah
 Khalifa bin Khalid bin Abdullah

Education
Khalid bin Abdullah Al Khalifa received a bachelor's degree in civil engineering from Cairo University.

Career
Khalifa worked as a roads engineer in the directorate of works in 1966. He became the director of public works in 1971. From 1975 to 1995 he served as the minister of housing, being the first housing minister of the country.

In 1979, he founded Bahrain Housing Bank and headed it until 2002. In addition, he was the chairman of the central municipal council from 1987 to 1995. He was named minister of housing, municipalities and environment in 1995 and in office until 2001. In 2001, Khalifa was appointed minister of housing and agriculture and served in the post until 2002.

He was appointed deputy prime minister for Islamic affairs in November 2010. He is also the CEO of Bahrain Olympic Committee and chairman of Mumtalakat Holding Company.

Committee memberships
 Member, Ministerial Committee for Development and Infrastructure Projects
 Chairman, Ministerial Committee for Financial and Economic Affairs
 Member, Supreme Planning Committee for 2011-2014 government sessions
 Chairman of the Board, Quality Assurance Authority for Education and Training
 Member, Ministerial Committee for Study of Parliamentary Investigation Errors
 Member, Planning and Coordination Council
 Member, Founding Committee of Beit Al Quran Museum
 Member, Supreme Council for Youth and Sports
 Member, Supreme Council for Traffic
 Member, Study Committee on Municipal Government
 Member, Supreme Drafting Committee for the National Action Charter
 Member, Committee on Constitutional Amendments
 Member, Housing and Construction Committee
 Chairman, Bahraini Section, Joint Ministerial Technical Committee for Construction of the Qatar–Bahrain Causeway
 Chairman, Ministerial Committee for Public Utilities, Cabinet
 Chairman, Ministerial Committee for Study of Pension Funding for the General Organization for Social Insurance and Pension Fund Authority
 Member, Ministerial Committee for Shura Council and Parliament Affairs
 Deputy Chairman, Review Committee for the National Strategic Structural Plan for the Kingdom
 Chairman, Pearl Diving Council
 Chairman, Ministerial Committee for Study of the Needs of Returnees from Abroad
 Founding member, Bahrain Society of Engineers
 Chairman, Water Resources Council
 Chairman, Ministerial Committee for Development and Infrastructure Projects
 Chairman, Ministerial Committee for Financial Affairs and Rationalising Expenditure
 Member, Bahrain Economic Development Board
 Member of the Coordinating Committee Headed by Salman, Crown Prince of Bahrain
 Chairman of the Board, Mumtalakat Holding Company
 Chairman, Gulf Air
 Vice-Chairman of the Board of Trustees, Isa Award for Services to Humanity
 Vice-President, Civil Service Bureau
 Chairman, High Committee for the Development of the Hawar Islands
 Member, Supreme Committee for Information and Communication Technology
 Member since 1981, Royal Family Council

Achievements

Awards
In 1999, he was awarded the Sheikh Isa bin Salman Al Khalifa Medal, First Class, by then-Emir Sheikh Hamad bin Isa Al Khalifa

Ministry of Housing
 Oversaw the completion of Isa Town, whose construction had started in 1963
 Commissioned the Ministry slogan: توفير مسكن لائق لكل أسرة بحرينية لا تملك ولا تستطيع بناء مسكن لها (“Providing decent housing for every Bahraini family who doesn’t own and cannot build a home”)
 Planned out Hamad Town and many residential projects elsewhere, along with general redevelopment throughout the country, including many old city centers

Central Municipal Council
 Concentrated on administrative and technical training and environmental issues; established parks; developed beaches, tourist islands, and central markets; promoted computerization

Environmental affairs
 Restored in Tubli Bay and prevented dumping there; protected Hawar Islands and surrounding waters; performed environmental assessments and formulated procedures for control on ozone-depleting substances; regulated asbestos handling in construction
 Approved a national oil pollution control plan and national standards on environmental assessment of industrial/development projects, medical waste, occupational health, and the pottery industry
 Monitored air quality, red tide, marine ecology, and fluoride concentrations
 Addressed pollution from mechanics’ garages, gold and aluminum smelting, exhaust, nylon bags, and marine sand washing

Events
Sheikh Khalid sponsored many local events in the engineering, environmental, construction, real estate, energy, housing, government, and infrastructure fields, and represented Bahrain in international forums such as the following:
 Headed national delegation to the 19th special session of the United Nations General Assembly Special Session on the Environment in 1997
 Headed national delegation at the 25th special session of the United Nations Conference on Human Settlements in 2002
 Headed national government and business delegation to Egypt that met with its then Interim President Adly Mansour and Commander-in-Chief of the Army and Defense Minister Abdel Fattah Al-Sisi in 2013
 Represented Bahrain at the Conference on Interaction and Confidence-Building Measures in Asia (CICA) in Shanghai in 2014
 Represented Bahrain at the international solidarity march against terrorism called by the President of Tunisia in response to the Bardo National Museum attack in March 2015
 Represented Bahrain at the last inauguration ceremony of  President of Sudan Omar al-Bashir

References

Living people
Khalid bin Abdullah Al
Cairo University alumni
Bahraini engineers
Government ministers of Bahrain
1944 births
People from Muharraq